Dropion (Greek: Δροπίων), (250 BC – 230 BC) was an ancient Paeonian king, son of Leon of Paionia.

References

Paeonia (kingdom)
Paeonian kings
3rd-century BC rulers
230 BC deaths